Nina Claire Snaith is a British mathematician at the University of Bristol working in random matrix theory and quantum chaos.

Education
Snaith was educated at the University of Bristol where she received her PhD in 2000 for research supervised by Jonathan Keating.

Career and research
In 1998, Snaith and her then adviser Jonathan Keating conjectured a value for the leading coefficient of the asymptotics of the moments of the Riemann zeta function. Keating and Snaith's guessed value for the constant was based on random-matrix theory, following
a trend that started with Montgomery's pair correlation conjecture. Keating's and Snaith's work extended works by Brian Conrey, Ghosh, and Gonek, also conjectural, based on number theoretic heuristics; Conrey, Farmer, Keating, Rubinstein, and Snaith later conjectured the lower terms in the asymptotics of the moments. Snaith's work appeared in her doctoral thesis Random Matrix Theory and zeta functions.

Awards and honours
In 2008, Snaith was awarded the London Mathematical Society's Whitehead Prize.

In 2014, she delivered the 2014 Hanna Neuman Lecture  to honour the achievements of women in mathematics.

Personal life
Snaith is the daughter of mathematician  and sister of mathematician and musician Dan Snaith, mostly known by his artistic name Caribou.

References

20th-century British mathematicians
21st-century British mathematicians
British women mathematicians
Alumni of the University of Bristol
Academics of the University of Bristol
Living people
Canadian mathematicians
Year of birth missing (living people)
Whitehead Prize winners
20th-century women mathematicians
21st-century women mathematicians